The Adios Pace is a horse race for three-year-old Standardbred colts and geldings run annually since 1967 at a distance of one mile at Meadows Racetrack in North Strabane Township, Washington County, Pennsylvania.

Historical race events
The 1972 race final was the only time the Adios Pace ended in a dead heat. 
In 1997 the race was renamed the Delvin Miller Adios Pace to honor the legendary Hall of Fame driver/trainer Delvin Miller. 1997 also saw the only winner disqualification in the race's history when Dream Away finished first by five lengths but was disqualified for interference.
In 1985, Nihilator won a division of the Adios Pace but was withdrawn from the final which would have been a match race against Marauder. To win, Marauder merely jogged around the track alone.
For 2008 the race was moved to Pocono Downs in Wilkes-Barre, Pennsylvania due to construction work at The Meadows.

Records
Speed record: (1 mile on a 5/8 mile oval)
1:47 4/5 - Bolt The Duer (2012) (New world record) 

Most wins by a driver:
8 - John Campbell (1984, 1987, 1992, 1993, 1994, 1995, 2002, 2003) 

Most wins by a trainer:
4 - Brett Pelling (1995, 1996, 2004, 2005)

Adios Pace winners

External links
 Video of Bolt The Duer's World Record in the 2012 Adios Pace

References

Recurring sporting events established in 1967
Harness races in the United States
Harness races for three-year-old pacers
1967 establishments in Pennsylvania